Coptops is a genus of longhorn beetles of the subfamily Lamiinae, containing the following species:

 Coptops aedificator (Fabricius, 1792) - Albizia long-horned beetle
 Coptops alboirrorata Fuchs, 1966
 Coptops albonotata (Pic, 1917)
 Coptops andamanica Breuning, 1935
 Coptops annamensis Breuning, 1938
 Coptops annobonae Aurivillius, 1910
 Coptops annulipes Gahan, 1864
 Coptops brunnea Breuning, 1936
 Coptops cameroni Breuning, 1978
 Coptops diversesparsa (Pic, 1917)
 Coptops huberi Siess, 1970
 Coptops humerosa Fairmaire, 1871
 Coptops hypocrita Lameere, 1892
 Coptops illicita Pascoe, 1865
 Coptops intermissa Pascoe, 1883
 Coptops leucostictica White, 1858
 Coptops lichenea Pascoe, 1865
 Coptops liturata (Klug, 1833)
 Coptops marmorea Breuning, 1939
 Coptops mourgliai Villiers, 1974
 Coptops nigropunctata Fairmaire, 1871
 Coptops ocellifera Breuning, 1964
 Coptops olivacea Breuning, 1935
 Coptops pacifica Breuning, 1969
 Coptops pardalis (Pascoe, 1862)
 Coptops pascoei Gahan, 1894
 Coptops purpureomixta (Pic, 1926)
 Coptops robustipes (Pic, 1925)
 Coptops rosacea Breuning, 1980
 Coptops rufa Thomson, 1878
 Coptops rugosicollis Breuning, 1968
 Coptops semiscalaris (Pic, 1928)
 Coptops similis Breuning, 1935
 Coptops szechuanica Gressitt, 1951
 Coptops tetrica (Newman, 1842)
 Coptops thibetana Breuning, 1974
 Coptops undulata Pascoe, 1865
 Coptops variegata Breuning, 1938
 Coptops vomicosa (Pascoe, 1862)

References

 
Mesosini
Cerambycidae genera